The 2019 Asian Track Cycling Championships took place at the Jakarta International Velodrome in Jakarta, Indonesia from 9 to 13 January 2019.

Medal summary

Men

Women

Medal table

References

Result book

External links
Results 

Asian Cycling Championships
Asia
2019 in Indonesian sport
International cycle races hosted by Indonesia
Asian Cycling Championships